Rear Admiral Dissanayake Mudiyanselage Sarath Dissanayake RWP, RSP, VSV, USP, NDU, MMS, HDMC, ADIDSM, AIMA, JP is a retired Sri Lankan Navy officer. Rear Admiral Sarath Dissanayake joined Sri Lanka Navy in 1982 as an Officer Cadet of the 11th Cadet Intake. During his highly decorated naval career, Rear Admiral Dissanayake had served in many ships and establishments and imparted his hard-earned experience and knowledge for the progress of the Navy.

Naval career

Dissanayake enlisted in the Sri Lanka Navy as an Officer Cadet in its 11th Intake on 15 November 1982, undergoing basic training at Naval and Maritime Academy, Trincomalee. He commanded the SLN flagship SLNS Sayura from 2006 to 2007, where 2 LTTE floating arsenal ships were hunted down and destroyed during the Sri Lankan Civil War. He also held the Flag officer commanding the naval fleet position based at Trincomalee during the Sri Lankan Civil War.

Other key staff appointments he has held at various times include:

 Area Commander, Northern  Naval Command (ComNorth)
 Director General Administration 
 Director Naval Personal.
 Flag officer Commanding Naval Fleet
 Deputy Area Commander, Eastern Naval Command
 Deputy Area Commander, Western Naval Command

Awards & Decorations
In order of precedence:
  Rana Wickrama Padakkama
  Rana Sura Padakkama
  Vishista Seva Vibhushanaya
  Uttama Seva Padakkama
  Sri Lanka Navy 50th Anniversary Medal
  Sri Lanka Armed Services Long Service Medal
  50th Independence Anniversary Commemoration Medal
  Eastern Humanitarian Operations Medal
  Northern Humanitarian Operations Medal 
  North and East Operations Medal
  Purna Bhumi Padakkama 
  Vadamarachchi Operation Medal
  Riviresa Campaign Services Medal

Badges & Pins

 Fast Attack Craft (FAC) Squadron Pin.
 Surface Warfare Badge.
 Commendation Badge.

References

External links
https://news.navy.lk/eventnews/2016/12/16/201612161600/
 http://www.sundaytimes.lk/130922/news/from-a-dvora-we-see-the-rape-of-our-sea-63327.html

Living people
1961 births
Sri Lankan rear admirals
Sinhalese military personnel